The Knockout is a 2023 Chinese criminal drama directed by , starring Zhang Yi, Zhang Songwen, Li Yitong, and Wu Gang. As well as the criminal investigation and anti-crime crime drama specially invited by S Ni Dahong and Han Tongsheng. It tells the story of a police officer's fight against organized crime over a period of 20 years, showing the rise and fall of underworld figures and corrupt officials. It premiered in China via CCTV-8 and iQIYI starting January 14, 2023. The show takes place in the city of Jinghai, and chronicles the 21-year feud between incorruptible policeman An Xin and fishmonger-turned-mobster Gao Qiqiang 20 years ago.

Introduction
In 2021, Jinghai City, Linjiang Province will carry out the normalization of the fight against gangsters and evil.
"Investigate back 20 years" to dig out a series of local old cases. As a result, the past events between criminal policeman An Xin and the local underworld Gao Qiqiang in 2000 and 2006 were gradually revealed.

Cast

Main

Supporting
Characters around Gao Qiqiang

Characters in Jinghai Public Security Bureau

Characters in Jinghai Municipal Party and Government Organs

Other characters

Soundtrack

Production
The name of The Knockout derives from a ci written by Mao Zedong in July 1930. Shooting began in October 2021 and ended in September 2022. Most of the TV series was shot on location in Jiangmen, Guangdong.

Reception
The Knockout is the top-rated TV series to be watched by CCTV-8 in the past nine years.

References

External links
 
   

2023 Chinese television series debuts
2023 Chinese television series endings
Chinese crime television series
Television series about organized crime